Patliputra University (PPU) is a collegiate public state university located in Patna, Bihar, India. It was established by an act of the state legislature in 2018. As a collegiate university, its main functions are divided between the academic departments of the university and affiliated colleges.

History 
In 2015, Bihar's education minister hinted that Magadh University (MU) may be split into two or three universities due to the difficulties faced in managing the colleges of oversized MU. In the month of July of the same year, then vice-chancellor of MU, Mohammad Ishtiyaque decided to strengthen the university's Patna branch office to reduce the student's necessity to visit the university headquarters situated at Bodh Gaya. As a part of the strengthening process, a committee was set up to monitor the expansion and growth of the Patna branch office.

On 30 July 2016, Bihar cabinet approved Bihar State Universities (Amendment) Bill 2016 and made way for the creation of Patliputra University by bifurcating the Magadh University. A notice was issued in October 2017 inviting application from candidates for the posts of vice-chancellor and pro-vice-chancellor. More than 150 professors applied for the jobs of vice-chancellor and pro-vice-chancellor. On 19 March 2018, Bihar Governor Satya Pal Malik appointed Girish Kumar Choudhary and Gulab Chand Ram Jaiswal as the pro-vice-chancellor and vice-chancellor of the Patliputra University, respectively, under the Bihar State University (Amendment) Act, 1976.

Academics
Admitted students of Magadh University (MU) will be awarded degrees by the MU. The university started operating academically from the 2018–19 academic year. The programmes being offered at the university be the same as the ones being offered at Magadh University.

The university plans to launch postgraduate departments in science, commerce and arts stream at university level after many of the postgraduate departments went to MU after the bifurcation. Some of Patna's better institutions come under Patliputra University after its creation.

Administration 
Rakesh Kumar Singh is the vice-chancellor of the university whereas Prof. Rajiv Kumar Mallik is the pro-vice-chancellor. Bihar's governor serves as the chancellor of Patliputra University. Jitendra Kumar is the registrar and Manoj Kumar is the proctor.

Campus 
The university is headquartered in Patna and administratively operate from Magadh University branch office on Kankarbagh old bypass in the Rajendra Nagar neighbourhood of Patna, whilst, its permanent campus will be located at Beur.

Colleges 
Its jurisdiction extends over two districts, Nalanda and Patna.

Affiliated Colleges 
 B B M B G Kanya College
 BLP College, Masaurhi
 BRSY College, Kanhauli
 Chandradeo Prasad Verma College, Simri, Patna 
 D N College, Masaurhi
 Dr. C P Thakur College, Naubatpur, Patna
 Dr. Ram Raj Singh Mahila College, Nalanda
 Jyoti Kunwar College, Fatehpur, Patna
 Kameshwar Prasad Singh College, Nadwan
 L P Shahi College, Patna
 P L S  College, Masaurhi 
 Paras Nath Kushwaha College
 Patna Muslim Science College, Patna
 R  P College, Datiyana, Bikram
 RLSY College, Anisabad
 R P S College, Bailey Road, Patna
 R P S Mahila College, Bailey Road, Patna
 RLSY College, Paliganj
 Ram Roop Prasad College,Patna
 S K M V College, Fatuha
 S N A Evening College, Barh
 Sir Ganesh Dutt Memorial College, Patna
 Sri Bhuwaneshwari Raja  College, Barh, Patna
 Deo Sharan Women's Evening College, Sohsarai, Nalanda 
 G D M College, Harnaut
 K S T College, Sohsarai
 Lal Singh Tyagi Gramin College, Nalanda
 Magadh Mahavidyalaya, Chandi, Nalanda
 Mahabodhi Mahavidyalaya, Nalanda
 Nalanda Sodh Sansthan
 P M S College, Paharpura
 R Lal College, Nalanda
 RLSY College, Nalanda
 R P S College, Harnaut
 S P College, Hilsa
 Sadanand, College,  Biharsharif, Nalanda 
 Snatak College, Nalanda
 Vardhman Mahavir College, Pawapuri

Constituent Colleges 
A N College, Patna
ANS College, Barh
B D College, Patna
BS College, Danapur
College Of Commerce, Arts & Science, Patna
G J College, Rambagh, Bihta
Ganga Devi Mahila College
J D Women's College, Patna
 Jagat Narain Lal College
 MM College, Bikram
 Mahila College, Khagaul
 Maltidhari College, Naubatpur
 Oriental college, Patna city
 RLSY College, Bakhtiyarpur
 RPM College, Patna
 Ram Krishna Dwarika College, Patna
 Ram Ratan Singh College
 SMD College, Punpun
 Sri Arvind Mahila College, Patna
 Sri Guru Gobind Singh College, Patna
 TPS College, Patna
 Kisan College, Nalanda
Nalanda College, Biharsharif
Nalanda Mahila College, Biharsharif
 Sardar Patel Memorial College
 SU College, Hilsa
 PMS College, Biharsharif

Controversies 

 In August 2018, an investigation committee of 5 members was constituted by Vice Chancellor Prof. Gulab Chand Ram Jaiswal to probe the charges of misbehaviour and irregularities against the then registrar of university Col. (Retd.) Kamesh Kumar. The committee was formed due to non-satisfactory reply of a showcause notice issued to the registrar previously. Rather than answering, he questioned several decisions taken by the university at that time. He allegedly confronted the VC and pro-VC on various issues related to academics and outsourcing of the security staff for the university. The committee was asked to submit its report in a day or two so that it could be finally sent to the Raj Bhavan for necessary directives in the matter from then chancellor cum Governor of Bihar, Satya Pal Malik.
 On October 15, 2019, the university issued notice to JD Women's College, asking it to make arrangements for starting PG department on the third floor of arts block of the college - a college fully reserved for girls. The university's letter caused unrest among college students. Hundreds of students staged protest demonstrations in college premises against the university's decision to admit male students in post-graduation courses from current academic session in a fully reserved girls' college. Soni, then president of JD Women's Students Union, said, “Entry of male students in the college campus would hamper safety and peaceful environment of the college. Various Student's Unions like Chhatra JDU, AISF etc of other colleges also supported the protest. University's pro-vice-chancellor Girish Kumar Choudhary said, “The building selected for PG department has a separate entrance gate. The university was looking for space in all constituent colleges to start PG courses. JD women's college has a newly constructed building which has vacant space. University asked for this only for temporary instance. For zero interference of PG department into college campus, the university is ready to barricade the space. Also, class timings will be coordinated so that PG classes should start after departure of UG classes". He accused politically affiliated students’ unions for politicising the decision for grabbing attention.

References

External links

 
Universities in Bihar
Educational institutions established in 2018
2018 establishments in Bihar